Gábor Török (30 May 1936 – 4 January 2004) was a Hungarian football goalkeeper, who played for Újpesti Dózsa. He won a bronze medal in football at the 1960 Summer Olympics with the Hungary national football team.

References

1936 births
2004 deaths
Association football goalkeepers
Hungarian footballers
Hungary international footballers
Újpest FC players
Olympic footballers of Hungary
Footballers at the 1960 Summer Olympics
Olympic bronze medalists for Hungary
Olympic medalists in football
Medalists at the 1960 Summer Olympics